Zhukovsky is a city in Moscow Oblast, Russia, located on the Moskva River,  southeast of Moscow. Population:

History
The urban-type settlement of Stakhanovo was founded in 1935 from the dacha settlement Otdykh (literally, "Relaxation"). It was named after Alexey Stakhanov, a famous Soviet miner. On April 23, 1947, the settlement was granted town status and renamed Zhukovsky, in honor of scientist Nikolay Zhukovsky.

Administrative and municipal status
Within the framework of administrative divisions, it is incorporated as Zhukovsky City Under Oblast Jurisdiction—an administrative unit with the status equal to that of the districts. As a municipal division, Zhukovsky City Under Oblast Jurisdiction is incorporated as Zhukovsky Urban Okrug.

Research and economy

Zhukovsky is a home to the M. M. Gromov Flight Research Institute and N. Ye. Zhukovsky Central Aerohydrodynamic Institute — they are two major facilities involved in testing and designing aircraft. These facilities were employers for a great portion of the city's population before perestroika. Also, there is situated the Aeromechanics faculty of MIPT.

There are a number smaller, but also important enterprises, such as:
Tikhomirov Scientific Research Institute of Instrument Design (NIIP),
Scientific Research Institute of Avionics (NIIAO),
Agat Moscow Scientific Research Institute (Agate),
Myasishchev Experimental Machine-building Plant  (EMZ).

The airline Aviastar-TU has its head office in Zhukovsky.

There are also a number of flight testing divisions of the aviation design bureaus (Sukhoy, Ilyushin, Tupolev, etc.) located in the area as well as machine-building plants, paper-mill food industry - Inko, Nestlé, local bread-baking plant.

In 2008, President Vladimir Putin signed a presidential decree establishing the National Aircraft Industry Centre.

Transport

 Zhukovsky International Airport
 Otdykh (Zhukovsky) railway stop
 Bus service to-from Moscow, Ramenskoye
 There is a helipad located at Lenin Square intended for air medical services

Sports
Zhukovsky is the center of track and field athletics in Moscow Oblast. Most notable athletes born in Zhukovsky are Yuriy Borzakovskiy, Yekaterina Podkopayeva, Andrey Yepishin, Dmitry Bogdanov, and others. In 2005 the Meteor international standard athletics stadium was opened.

There was also a bandy club Strela based in Zhukovsky.

Culture 
Zhukovsky museum was opened in 1979. It contains a unique collection of pilot's uniform and equipment.

Twin towns – sister cities

Zhukovsky is twinned with:

Le Bourget, France
Fangchenggang, China
Hemet, United States
Meerut, India
San Jacinto, United States
Sydals (Sønderborg), Denmark
Zhuhai, China

Notable people
Irina Devina, rhythmic gymnast
Maria Tolkacheva, rhythmic gymnast
Viktoria Mullova, concert violinist
Vladislav Namestnikov, ice hockey player with the Detroit Red Wings

References

Notes

Sources

External links

Official website of Zhukovsky  
Zhukovsky Business Directory  

Cities and towns in Moscow Oblast
Cities and towns built in the Soviet Union
Populated places established in 1935
Naukograds